Ray Stamp (born 12 September 1950) is  a former Australian rules footballer who played with Footscray in the Victorian Football League (VFL). 

Ray’s first game was round 5 for Footscray who played Hawthorn at Glenferry Road Hawthorn. Ray kicked 2 goals that day with his first 2 kicks, one in the first quarter and one in the second.

Notes

External links 		
		
		
		
		
		
		
Living people		
1950 births		
		
Australian rules footballers from Victoria (Australia)		
Western Bulldogs players
Sale Football Club players